Clethra is a genus of flowering shrubs or small trees described as a genus by Linnaeus in 1753.

Clethra is one of two genera in the family Clethraceae (the other being Purdiaea). The species may be evergreen or deciduous, and all bear flowers in clusters (inflorescences), which correspond to racemes or panicles. The flowers are quite small, white or pinkish, and each bear 5 free petals, numerous stamens, and a 3-chambered seed capsule. The leaves, simple, ovate, and alternate or opposite, bear characteristic stellate hairs. The seeds are very small and numerous.

Distribution
Clethra species are native to a variety of habitats, including swamps, woodland, and rocky sites from temperate to tropical climates in eastern and southeastern Asia, Malesia, North and South America, and one species (C. arborea) on the island of Madeira.

Fossil record
Several fossil fruits and seeds of †Clethra cimbrica have been described from middle Miocene strata of the Fasterholt area near Silkeborg in Central Jutland, Denmark.

Species
The number of species accepted varies between different authorities depending on taxonomic interpretation, but with a recent trend to reduce the number recognised as distinct. The recent Flora of China (series) has cut the number accepted for China from 35 to seven species, and the US Department of Agriculture recognises only two in the United States, synonymising C. tomentosa with C. alnifolia. The following are accepted by the World Checklist of Selected Plant Families:

 Clethra acuminata  – mountain pepper bush; S Appalachians (Alabama to Pennsylvania)
 Clethra alcoceri - Hidalgo, Jalisco
 Clethra alexandri - Jamaica
 Clethra alnifolia  – sweet pepper bush; S + E United States (Texas to Maine)
 Clethra arborea – lily of the valley tree; Madeira, Canary islands†, Azores
 Clethra arfakana - New Guinea
 Clethra barbinervis – Japanese sweet shrub; SE China, Korea, Japan
 Clethra bodinieri – S China
 Clethra canescens - Philippines, E + C Indonesia, New Guinea
 var. clementis – Borneo
 Clethra castaneifolia - Peru
 Clethra chiapensis - Chiapas
 Clethra consimilis - Panama, Costa Rica
 Clethra conzattiana - Oaxaca
 Clethra crispa – Ecuador
 Clethra cubensis - Cuba
 Clethra cuneata - Peru, Bolivia
 Clethra delavayi – SW China, Assam, Myanmar, Bhutan, Vietnam
 Clethra elongata - Peru, Bolivia
 Clethra fabri – S China, Vietnam
 Clethra fagifolia - Ecuador, Colombia, Venezuela
 Clethra fargesii – C China
 Clethra ferruginea - Peru
 Clethra fimbriata – Peru, Ecuador, Colombia
 Clethra formosa - Costa Rica
 Clethra fragrans - Jalisco, Michoacán, Guerrero
 Clethra galeottiana - Puebla, Oaxaca, Chiapas
 Clethra gelida - Costa Rica, Panama, Honduras
 Clethra guyanensis - Guyana, Venezuela
 Clethra hartwegii - C + S Mexico
 Clethra hendersonii - Peninsular Malaysia
 Clethra hirsutovillosa - Guerrero
 Clethra hondurensis - Tabasco to Costa Rica
 Clethra javanica - Java, Bali, Lombok, Timor
 Clethra kaipoensis – SE China
 Clethra kebarensis - New Guinea
 Clethra licanioides – Guatemala, Honduras
 Clethra longispicata  – Borneo, Philippines, Sulawesi, Maluku
 Clethra luzmariae - Oaxaca
 Clethra macrophylla - Veracruz, Puebla
 Clethra mexicana – C + S Mexico, Central America, Colombia, Venezuela, Trinidad
 Clethra oaxacana - Oaxaca
 Clethra obovata – Ecuador, Peru
 Clethra occidentalis - Jamaica
 Clethra oleoides - C + S Mexico, Central America
 Clethra ovalifolia – Colombia, Venezuela, Ecuador, Peru
 Clethra pachecoana - Chiapas to Honduras
 Clethra pachyphylla – Borneo
 Clethra papuana - New Guinea
 Clethra paralelinervia – Ecuador
 Clethra × parvifolia - Chiapas
 Clethra pedicellaris - Colombia, Ecuador, Peru
 Clethra peruviana - Ecuador, Peru
 Clethra petelotii – Vietnam, Yunnan
 Clethra poilanei - Laos
 Clethra pringlei - Mexican summersweet - Mexico
 Clethra pulgarensis - Palawan
 Clethra purpusii - Oaxaca, Chiapas
 Clethra pyrogena - Panama, Costa Rica
 Clethra repanda – Colombia, Venezuela
 Clethra retivenia - Peru
 Clethra revoluta – Colombia, Bolivia, Ecuador, Peru
 Clethra rosei - Mexico
 Clethra rugosa – Colombia, Ecuador
 Clethra scabra – Brazil, Bolivia, Paraguay, NW Argentina
 Clethra skutchii - Guatemala
 Clethra sleumeriana - Hunan
 Clethra suaveolens - S Mexico, Central America
 Clethra sumatrana - Sumatra
 Clethra sumbawaensis - Lesser Sunda Islands
 Clethra symingtonii - Perak
 Clethra talamancana - Costa Rica
 Clethra tomentella - Philippines
 Clethra tutensis - Panama
 Clethra tuxtlensis - Veracruz
 Clethra uleana - S Brazil
 Clethra vicentina - S Mexico, Central America

References

External links
 
 

 
Ericales genera
Taxa named by Carl Linnaeus